Edimilson Souza (born October 17, 1984), professionally known as Kevin Souza, is a Brazilian mixed martial artist who competed in the featherweight division of the Ultimate Fighting Championship. A professional MMA competitor since 2009, Kevin made a name for himself fighting all over his home country of Brazil. He is a former Jungle Fight Featherweight Champion.

Mixed martial arts career

Ultimate Fighting Championship
After three successful Jungle Fight Featherweight Championship title defenses in Brazil, Kevin Souza replaced Sam Sicilia and was scheduled to make his UFC debut against Felipe Arantes on September 4, 2013, at UFC Fight Night 28. He won the fight via split decision.

He later faced Mark Eddiva on May 31, 2014, at The Ultimate Fighter Brazil 3 Finale. Kevin won the fight via TKO due to punches with only eight seconds left for the end of the second round and received a Fight of the Night bonus as well.

Souza faced Katsunori Kikuno on March 21, 2015 at UFC Fight Night 62. He won the fight by knockout in the first round.

Souza faced Chas Skelly on November 7, 2015 at UFC Fight Night 77. Despite hurting Skelly a number of times with punches, Souza lost the fight via submission in the second round and was subsequently released from the promotion.

Bellator
It was announced that Souza had signed with Bellator MMA, he is replaced the injured Derek Campos at Bellator 152 against Patricky Freire on just four days notice on April 16 2016. Souza lost the fight via unanimous decision (30-27,30-27,30-27)

Titles and accomplishments

Mixed martial arts
Ultimate Fighting Championship
Fight of the Night (One time) vs Mark Eddiva
Performance of the Night (One time) vs Katsunori Kikuno
Jungle Fight
Jungle Fight Featherweight Championship (One Time)
Three successful title defenses

Mixed martial arts record 

|-
|Loss
|align=center|18–7
|Predrag Bogdanović
|TKO (leg injury)
|Serbian Battle Championship 44
|
|align=center|1
|align=center|3:13
|Belgrade, Serbia
|
|-
|Loss
|align=center|18–6
|Heinrich Caceres
|KO (head kick)
|CTF 3
|
|align=center|1
|align=center|3:15
|Asunción, Paraguay
|
|-
|Win
|align=center|18–5
|Denis Silva
|Decision (split)
|Future FC 6
|
|align=center|3
|align=center|5:00
|São Paulo, Brazil
|
|-
|Win
|align=center|17–5
|Janio Carvalho
|TKO (punches)
|MF Fighters 1
|
|align=center|1
|align=center|0:08
|São José do Rio Preto, Brazil
|
|-
| Loss
| align=center|16–5
| Patricky Freire
|Decision (unanimous)
| Bellator 152
| 
| align=center|3
| align=center|5:00
| Torino, Italy
| 
|-
|Loss
|align=center| 16–4
|Chas Skelly
|Submission (rear-naked choke)
|UFC Fight Night: Belfort vs. Henderson 3
|
|align=center| 2
|align=center| 1:56
|São Paulo, Brazil
| 
|-
|Win
|align=center|16–3
|Katsunori Kikuno
|KO (punch)
|UFC Fight Night: Maia vs. LaFlare
|
|align=center|1
|align=center|1:31
|Rio de Janeiro, Brazil
|
|-
|Win
|align=center|15–3
|Mark Eddiva
|TKO (punches)
|The Ultimate Fighter Brazil 3 Finale: Miocic vs. Maldonado
|
|align=center|2
|align=center|4:52
|São Paulo, Brazil
|
|-
|Win
|align=center|14–3
|Felipe Arantes
|Decision (split)
|UFC Fight Night: Teixeira vs. Bader
|
|align=center|3
|align=center|5:00
|Belo Horizonte, Brazil
|
|-
|Win
|align=center|13–3
|Fabiano Nogueira
|KO (punch)
|Jungle Fight 51
|
|align=center|1
|align=center|4:47
|Rio de Janeiro, Brazil
|
|-
|Win
|align=center|12–3
|João Antonio Gois
|TKO (punches)
|Tavares Combat 2
|
|align=center|1
|align=center|1:19
|Itajaí, Brazil
|
|-
|Win
|align=center|11–3
|Mauro Chaulet
|KO (punch)
|Jungle Fight 47
|
|align=center|1
|align=center|3:03
|Porto Alegre, Brazil
|
|-
|Win
|align=center|10–3
|Henrique Gomes
|TKO (retirement)
|Jungle Fight 42
|
|align=center|2
|align=center|3:30
|São Paulo, Brazil
|
|-
|Win
|align=center|9–3
|Fabiano Nogueira
|TKO (punches)
|Jungle Fight 39
|
|align=center|1
|align=center|2:18
|Rio de Janeiro, Brazil
|
|-
|Win
|align=center|8–3
|Felipe Cruz
|KO (knee)
|Floripa Fight 8
|
|align=center|3
|align=center|1:14
|Florianópolis, Brazil
|
|-
|Win
|align=center|7–3
|Geison Costa
|TKO (punches)
|São José Super Fight 1
|
|align=center|1
|align=center|0:20
|São José, Brazil
|
|-
|Loss
|align=center|6–3
|José Ivanildo
|Submission (guillotine choke)
|Nitrix Champion Fight 7
|
|align=center|1
|align=center|3:40
|Balneário Camboriú, Brazil
|
|-
|Loss
|align=center|6–2
|Claudinei Maia
|Submission (rear-naked choke)
|Centurion Mixed Martial Arts
|
|align=center|2
|align=center|3:41
|Balneário Camboriú, Brazil
|
|-
|Win
|align=center|6–1
|Daniel Mota
|Submission (guillotine choke)
|Sul Fight Championship 4
|
|align=center|1
|align=center|
|Florianópolis, Brazil
|
|-
|Win
|align=center|5–1
|Renato Gomes
|TKO (punches)
|Black Trunk Fight 1
|
|align=center|1
|align=center|
|Florianópolis, Brazil
|
|-
|Win
|align=center|4–1
|Sebastian Vidal
|TKO (body punch)
|Floripa Fight 6
|
|align=center|2
|align=center|
|Florianópolis, Brazil
|
|-
|Win
|align=center|3–1
|Sebastian Vidal
|KO (punches)
|Warrior's Challenge 4
|
|align=center|1
|align=center|
|Porto Belo, Brazil
|
|-
|Win
|align=center|2–1
|John Paine
|TKO (punches)
|Argentina Fighting Championships
|
|align=center|1
|align=center|1:14
|Buenos Aires, Argentina
|
|-
|Loss
|align=center|1–1
|Marcos Vinicius
|Submission (rear-naked choke)
|Samurai FC 2: Warrior's Return
|
|align=center|1
|align=center|1:26
|Curitiba, Brazil
|
|-
|Win
|align=center|1–0
|Rodrigo Flecha
|KO (punch)
|VIP - Stage 4
|
|align=center|1
|align=center|0:15
|Joinville, Brazil
|
|-

See also
 List of current UFC fighters
 List of male mixed martial artists

References

External links
 
 

Brazilian male mixed martial artists
1984 births
Living people
Featherweight mixed martial artists
Mixed martial artists utilizing boxing
Ultimate Fighting Championship male fighters
Sportspeople from Salvador, Bahia